The Caphiridzange explosion was an accident that occurred on 17 November 2016. 80 people were killed and more than a hundred people injured in a fuel tanker explosion in the town of Caphiridzange, Tete Province, Mozambique. The fuel tanker was en route to Malawi at the time and carried 30,000 liters of gasoline. The government subsequently declared three days of national mourning on 19 November to pay tribute to the victims.

See also
2007 Maputo arms depot explosion
List of explosions

References

2016 in Mozambique
Explosions in Mozambique
Explosions in 2016
November 2016 events in Africa
Tete Province
Deaths caused by petroleum looting
Tanker explosions
2016 disasters in Mozambique